Doel Square (Doel Chattar) is one of the popular areas of the University of Dhaka campus located in Shahbag, Dhaka. There is sculpture of Oriental magpie-robin in the middle of the Doel Square. The oriental magpie-robin is the national bird of Bangladesh and locally known as the doyel or doel (Bengali:  দোয়েল). The sculpture's architect is Azizul Jalil Pasha. Doel Square is a bearer and carrier of the national culture of Bangladesh.

Location 
It is located in-front of the Curzon Hall in the University of Dhaka area.

Area description 
Doel Square is a popular place for shopping Bangladeshi traditional handicrafts including handmade bamboo, wooden, jute, pottery items and other decorative things.

Different craftsmen sit in the Doel Square area; About 40 pottery shops and a total of 50 bamboo, cane and wood handicraft shops selling various decorative items here. There are thousands of traditional Bangladeshi products including various clay utensils, small and large pots and pans of different sizes, pitcher, vases, decorative toys, earthen jars, cups and saucers, jugs, dishes, bowls, terracotta sculpture , clay fruits, ornaments, Baishakhi bangle, cane and wood showpiece, jute shikas, dolls, jute hand pars, jute side bags, hogla leaves and various kinds of coconut shell showpiece are found here. Also carved palm leaf fans, bamboo flute, kulo, basket, clay bird, boat replicas, ektara, Khartal, Dhol, beaded garlands, village hut replicas, rural paintings are available.

See also
 Shapla Square

References 

Buildings and structures in Dhaka
Tourist attractions in Dhaka
Outdoor sculptures in Bangladesh
Squares in Bangladesh